Posof (formerly ) is a town in Ardahan Province of Turkey, in the far east of the country, 75 km from the city of Ardahan and near the border with Georgia. It is the seat of Posof District. Its population is 2,106 (2021). Posof is well known for its handicrafts particularly its ornate silver belts and knives.

Geography
Posof is high in the mountains near the source of the River Çoruh, much of the district is pine forest. The town consists of the quarters Merkez and Doğrular.

References

Populated places in Ardahan Province
Towns in Turkey
Posof District